A rosette is an award made from ribbon and presented to mark an achievement. Such ribbons usually have a pin, brooch or bridle clip as a fastener with which the award can be attached to clothing, animals, walls, or other surfaces.

Award ribbons can be simply a flat piece of ribbon, a flat-folded ribbon, or fancier manipulations of the ribbon material, such as rosettes. A rosette consists of ribbon that is pleated or gathered and arranged in a circle so that it resembles a rose, usually with streamer ribbons attached. Some ribbon rosettes will also have loops, petals and star points as part of the design whilst using Satin ribbons, Velvet ribbons, Sheer ribbons, Lamé ribbons, Tartan ribbons and printed ribbons including personalised printed ribbons to promote the sponsor, event or the reason for giving.

Ribbons are usually imprinted with information about the award, such as the name of the event, the sponsoring organization, the placement (such as first place, second place, third place), and the date. More sophisticated awards also include the name of the recipient, special motifs and logos.

Ribbon rosette awards come in many sizes from 1 Tier (1 layer) up to super sized rosettes of (as standard) 20 Tiers. They can be glued together or sewn, however the centre disks always need to be stuck on with glue.

A ribbon rosette is made up with card backing disks to attach the pleated ribbon onto thus make the tiers of the rosette. Star points, petals and loops can be added, then chosen fastener, then tails and then the centre disk.

Rosettes can be used for awards for shows and events for all types: sports, hobbies, academics, animals, business, and education as well.

Celebration Rosettes are given to mark Birthdays, Valentine's Day, Christmas, Easter, Halloween or other special occasions like Weddings, Christenings and even Funerals. They can also come with a ribbon attachment allowing the rosettes to be hung up to display both sides, as some rosettes are produced back to back, creating two sides.

Rosettes are also produced in different shapes other than a circle, like ovals, squares, diamonds, rectangles and hearts. Ribbon awards also come in different varieties like, medals, sashes and banners all of which can be personalised at many bespoke and wholesale companies from around the world.

Flower rosettes seem to be new to the market since 2012, where particular flowers are stylised into a rosette. Flower rosettes so far include Daffodil Rosettes, Carnation Rosettes and Rose Rosettes all of which can be used as a gift or an award, as a single Flower Rosette or as a bunch of Flower Rosettes depending on the occasion as its use.

Gallery

See also
 Plaquette
Ribbon bar
Rosette (decoration)
 Statuette

References

 
Award items